The Tampines Expressway (TPE) is a highway in the north-eastern fringe of Singapore, joining the Pan Island Expressway (PIE) near Singapore Changi Airport in the east with the Central Expressway (CTE) and Seletar Expressway (SLE) in the north of the island.

History

The expressway was constructed alongside the development of Tampines New Town in the 1980s. On 22 February 1986, tenders were called for the first section of the expressway. Work began on 5 August 1986 to widen the existing portions of Tampines Road. The first section of the expressway, stretching from the PIE to Elias Road, opened on 30 September 1987.

On 19 November 1987, the contracts for the second phase of the expressway were awarded to Sembawang Construction and Hock Lian Seng Engineering. Phase 2 of the expressway, stretching westward from Elias Road to Lorong Halus, began construction on 24 December 1987 and opened on 30 May 1989.

In the 1990s, extensions towards the west were made to connect the TPE with the CTE and SLE to serve the newer residential areas of Sengkang and Punggol and provide a continuous expressway link between the northern and eastern parts of the island. These extensions acquired much of Lorong Lumut, Lorong Halus Village, Cheng Lim Farmway, Jalan Kayu Village, Lorong Andong, Lorong Anchak and Boh Sua Tian Road. On 30 August 1992, the Public Works Department began construction of Punggol Flyover. On 13 April 1993, a local firm was awarded the tender to extend the TPE to Seletar. On 30 June 1994, the Public Works Department awarded a $38.9 million contract to Koh Brothers Building and Civil Engineering Contractor Pte Ltd for the construction of the Lorong Halus road interchange. The expressway was completed in August 1996 after the Lorong Halus interchange was completed.

In 1998, two new viaducts and a loop connecting the TPE and PIE were constructed to reduce travelling times between Pasir Ris, Tampines and Changi Airport.

List of exits

References

External links

 Traffic camera monitoring the TPE

Expressways in Singapore
Changi
Pasir Ris
Paya Lebar
Punggol
Seletar
Sengkang
Tampines
Transport in North-East Region, Singapore